Gan Yingbo (born 22 April 1985) is a Chinese football manager and a former player.

Career statistics

Club

Notes

References

1985 births
Living people
Chinese footballers
Association football midfielders
Chinese Super League players
China League One players
Sichuan Guancheng players
Chengdu Tiancheng F.C. players
Sichuan Longfor F.C. players